The Qualitative Data Analysis Program (QDAP) was founded in 2005 at the University of Pittsburgh in the University Center for Social and Urban Research. QDAP is a fee-for-service research laboratory that develops software and methods to support multi-coder annotation projects. In 2008, QDAP-UMass was opened at the University of Massachusetts Amherst. Researchers at QDAP developed the Coding Analysis Toolkit (CAT), which is a free, open source, web-based CAQDAS package.

References

External links
QDAP-UMass

University of Pittsburgh